Boynton is an unincorporated community in Sullivan County, in the U.S. state of Missouri.

East Locust Creek flows past the west side of the community. The Chicago, Burlington and Quincy Railroad passed through the community.

History
Boynton was platted in 1877, and most likely named after Sumner Boynton, a county official. A post office called Boynton was established in 1876 and remained in operation until 1953.

References

Unincorporated communities in Sullivan County, Missouri
Unincorporated communities in Missouri